Zachary “Zach” Farache (born December 11, 1997), professionally known as Verzache (stylized as verzache), is a Toronto-based singer, songwriter, producer and instrumentalist.

Biography 
Farache began with producing electronic music in his teens, and started to create his own music in late 2014. In an interview with Elevator Magazine, he reported that he started with digital music software FL Studio and Logic Pro X, but now uses Ableton Live 9. His first EP, D97, was released in 2016. The EP featured the song "Waiting For You" with musician Swell, which ended up being his most successful track to date. In 2018, and 2019, he started to gain attention with singles  "Losing My Love," "Needs," and "No More."   In March 2020, one of Farache's upcoming shows in Brooklyn was featured as one of the "12 Pop, Rock and Jazz Concerts to Check Out in N.Y.C. This Weekend" in The New York Times.

Discography

Albums 

 My Head is a Moshpit (2021)
 Thought Pool (2018)

EPs 

 D97 (2016)

Singles 
 Broke Mine (2022)
 All I Need (2021)
 Look Away (2020)
 Calling (2020)
 Messed Up (2020)
 Life Inside (2020)
 Talk (2020)
 I Don't Wanna Be Nothin''' (2019)
 Feeling That Feel (2019)
 Cable (2019)
 January (2019)
 No More (2018)
 Needs (2018)
 Losing My Love (2018)
 Attached (2017)
 Fix Me (2017)
 Conscious (2017)
 Juvenescence (2017)
 Prudent (2017)
 Ice Cream (2017)
 Hiccup (2017)
 The Loser (2016)
 French'' (2016)

References 

Living people
1997 births